Colin G. Nichols FRS is the Carl Cori Endowed Professor, and Director of the Center for Investigation of Membrane Excitability Diseases at Washington University in St. Louis, Missouri.

Education
Nichols was educated at the University of Leeds where he was awarded a Bachelor of Science degree in Biochemistry and Physiology in 1982, followed by a PhD in 1985 for research on cardiac muscle in mammals supervised by Brian R. Jewell.

Career
Following his PhD, Nichols completed postdoctoral research at the University of Maryland, College Park in the laboratory of W. Jonathan Lederer. He was appointed Assistant Professor at Washington University School of Medicine in 1991 and Full Professor in 2000.

Research
Nichol's research investigates the biology of ion channels, particularly potassium channels, and their role in diabetes mellitus, cardiac dysrhythmias and epilepsy. Nichols uses models to investigate the structure, function and regulation of ion channels, which control what cells do by controlling their electrical polarity.

Awards and honours
Nichols was elected a Fellow of the Royal Society (FRS) in 2014. His nomination reads:

References

Living people
Fellows of the Royal Society
Year of birth missing (living people)
British expatriates in the United States
Washington University in St. Louis faculty
University System of Maryland people
Alumni of the University of Leeds
Washington University School of Medicine faculty